Often a television series becomes so successful and popular or attains such a cult status that the franchise produces books either directly based on it (adapted from the episode scripts) or strongly inspired by it (but describing new adventures of the characters).

Television series
The following is a list of television series which were used as the basis for novels (see also Category:Novels based on television series).

Web series 
The following is a list of web series which were used as the basis for novels.

See also
List of multimedia franchises originating in television series
Media mix
List of television show franchises

References 

 Books
Lists of books based on works
 
Books
Series